Shaheedur Rahman (born 1 January 1963) is a former Bangladeshi cricketer who played in two One Day Internationals (ODIs) in 1986. He played before the establishment of the first-class game in Bangladesh, and before his nation attained Test status, but did represent his country in England in the 1986 ICC Trophy Tournament for non-Test playing nations.

He made his full One Day International debut on 31 March 1986 in the Asia Cup against Pakistan at the Tyronne Fernando Stadium, Moratuwa and played his second match against Sri Lanka at the Asgiriya Stadium, Kandy in the same competition.  A right-handed top order batsman, he came in at number four and top scored with 37 from 60 balls on debut.

References

Bangladesh One Day International cricketers
Bangladeshi cricketers
Living people
1963 births
People from Chittagong